Yuri Luchko is a German professor of mathematics at the Berlin University of Applied Sciences and Technology. His 90 works were peer-reviewed and appeared in such journals as the Fractional Calculus and Applied Analysis and Journal of Mathematical Analysis and Applications, among others.

References

21st-century German mathematicians
Living people
20th-century births
Scientists from Berlin
Year of birth missing (living people)